Vazha-Pshavela, simply referred to as Vazha (26 July 1861 – 10 July 1915), is the pen name of the Georgian poet and writer Luka Razikashvili.

"Vazha-Pshavela" literally means "a son of Pshavians" in Georgian.

Life 
Vazha-Pshavela was born into a family of clergymen in the little village of Chargali, situated in the mountainous Pshavi province of Eastern Georgia. He graduated from the Pedagogical Seminary in Gori 1882, where he associated closely with Georgian populists (Russian term narodniki). He then entered the faculty of Law of St. Petersburg University (Russia) in 1883, as a non-credit student, but returned to Georgia in 1884 due to financial constraints. Here he found employment as a teacher of the Georgian language. He also attained prominence as a famous representative of the National-Liberation movement of Georgia.   
 
Vazha-Pshavela embarked on his literary career in the mid-1880s. In his works, he portrayed the everyday life and psychology of his contemporary Pshavs. Vazha-Pshavela is the author of many world-class literary works  – 36 epics, about 400 poems ("Aluda Ketelauri", "Bakhtrioni", "Gogotur and Apshina", "Host and Guest", "Snake eater", "Eteri", "Mindia", etc.), plays, and stories, as well as literary criticism, journalism and scholarly articles of ethnographic interest. Even in his fiction he evokes the life of the Georgian highlander with a near-ethnographic precision and depicts an entire world of mythological concepts. In his poetry, the poet addresses the heroic past of his people and extols the struggle against enemies both external and internal. (poems A Wounded Snow Leopard (1890), A Letter of a Pshav Soldier to His Mother (1915), etc.).

In the best of his epic compositions, Vazha-Pshavela deals powerfully with the problems raised by the interaction of the individual with society, of humankind with the natural world and of human love with love of country. The conflict between an individual and a temi (community) is depicted in the epics Aluda Ketelauri (1888, Russian translation, 1939) and Guest and Host (1893, Russian translation 1935). The principal characters in both works come to question and ultimately to disregard outdated laws upheld by their respective communities, in their personal journey toward a greater humanity that transcends the merely parochial.

The poet's overarching theme is that of a strong-willed people, its dignity, and its zeal for freedom. The same themes are touched upon in the play The Rejected One (1894). Vazha-Pshavela idealizes the Pshavs' time-honoured rituals, their purity, and their 'non-degeneracy' comparing and contrasting these with the values of what he considers 'false civilization'. He argues that 'Every true patriot is cosmopolitan and every genuine cosmopolitan is a patriot'.

The wise man Mindia in the epic Snake-Eater (1901, Russian translation 1934) dies because he cannot reconcile his ideals with the needs of his family and those of society. The catalytic plot device of Mindia's consumption of serpent's flesh in an attempt at suicide – which results instead in his obtaining of occult knowledge, constitutes a literary employment of the central, folk tale motif present in The White Snake (Brothers Grimm) which epitomizes  tale type 673 in the Aarne-Thompson classification system.

The epic Bakhtrioni (1892, Russian translation 1943) tells of the part played by the tribes of the Georgian highlands in the uprising of Kakheti (East Georgia) against the Iranian oppressors in 1659.

Vazha-Pshavela is also unrivalled in the field of Georgian poetry in his idiosyncratic and evocative depictions of Nature – for which he felt a deep love. His landscapes are full of motion and internal conflicts. His poetic diction is saturated with all the riches of his native tongue, and yet this is an impeccably exact literary language. Thanks to excellent translations into Russian (by Nikolay Zabolotsky, V. Derzhavin, Osip Mandelshtam, Boris Pasternak, S. Spassky, Marina Tsvetaeva, and others), into English (by Donald Rayfield, Venera Urushadze, Lela Jgerenaia, Nino Ramishvili, and others), into French (by Gaston Bouatchidzé), and into German (by Yolanda Marchev, Steffi Chotiwari-Jünger), the poet's work has found the wider audience that it undoubtedly deserves.
Furthermore, Vazha-Pshavela's compositions have also become available to representatives of other nationalities of the ex-USSR. To date, his poems and narrative compositions have been published in more than 20 languages

Vazha-Pshavela died in Tiflis on 10 July 1915 and was buried there, in the ancient capital city of his native land, being accorded the signal honour of a tomb in the prestigious Pantheon of the Mtatsminda Mountain, in recognition both of his literary achievements and his role as a representative of the National Liberation movement of Georgia.

The mountaineer poet Vazha-Pshavela is indeed, as Donald Rayfield writes, "qualitatively of a greater magnitude than any other Georgian writer".

The five epic poems of Vazha-Pshavela ('Aluda Ketelauri' (1888), 'Bakhtrioni' (1892), 'Host and Guest' (1893), 'The Avenger of the Blood' (1897) and 'Snake Eater' (1901)) are composed on the principle of the Golden ratio, and thus invite comparison with the works of Ancient and Renaissance authors similarly inspired.

In 1961, a museum and memorial was built in Chargali to honor Vazha-Pshavela, its most famous son.

Works

Epic poems 
 Aluda Ketelauri, 1888
 Bakhtrioni, 1892
 Host and Guest, 1893
 The Avenger of the Blood, 1897
 The Snake-eater, 1901

Other poetry
 A Feast, 1886
 The Ogre's Wedding, 1886
 The Eagle, 1887
 I Was in the Mountains, 1890
 The Rock and the River, 1899
 I Gaze at the Mountains, 1899
 Orphaned Fledglings, 1899
 A Goldfinger's Will, 1891
 A Night in the Highland, 1890
 To the Mountains, 1910

Short stories 
 The Story of the Roebuck, 1883
 An Old Beech, 1889
 The Mountain's Height, 1895
 Sataguri (en: Mousetrap), 1908

Plays (theatre) 
 The Scene in the Mountain, 1889
 Hunted of the Homeland (drama), 1894
 The Forest Comedy, 1911

Movies 
 sophia (The encounter), romantic drama, adapted from the Vazha-Pshavela poems "Aluda Ketelauri" and "Host and Guest", (this movie was awarded the Grand Prix at the 17th San Remo international Festival of Author Films, 1974), the film director Tengiz Abuladze – 1967
 Mokvetili, romantic drama, adapted from the Vazha-Pshavela  play Hunted of the homeland, the film director Giorgi (Gia) Mataradze – 1992
 "Host and Guest" Dramatic adaptation of Vazha-Pshavela's epic poem of the same name, devised by Synetic Theater (Arlington, Virginia) – USA – directed by Paata Tsikurishvili – 2002 – https://www.youtube.com/watch?v=ZEuJCVC4jt0

References

Further reading 
 Unveiling Vazha Pshavela: A dozen poems by Vazha with stories and artworks inspired by him, translated by Donald Rayfield OBE, edited by Andro Semeiko, (Garnett Press, London, 2019). .
 Rebecca Ruth Gould, The Death of Bagrat Zakharych and other Stories by Vazha-Pshavela (London: Paper & Ink, 2019). .
 Grigol Robakidze, "Georgian Poet Vazha-Pshavela".- J. "Russkaya Mysl", August 1911 (in Russian)
 Isidore Mantskava, "Vazha-Pshavela".- J. "Damoukidebeli Sakartvelo", Paris, No: 119, 1935, pp. 9–11 (in Georgian)
 Miho Mosulishvili, "Vazha-Pshavela", Non-fiction, a series of The Illustrative Biographies from Publishing house Pegasi, 2011,  (in Georgian)

External links 

 "Georgian literature." Encyclopædia Britannica.
 Anniversaries with which UNESCO is associated in 2010–2011, (24) 150th anniversary of the birth of Vazha Pshavela, writer (1861–1915) (Georgia)
 Celebration of anniversaries with which UNESCO is associated in 2010–2011, (Brochure (pdf), page 68)
 Vazha Pshavela
 Host and Guest
 Vazha-Pshavela on Allgeo.org

1861 births
1915 deaths
Burials at Mtatsminda Pantheon
Writers from Georgia (country)
19th-century poets from Georgia (country)
Dramatists and playwrights from Georgia (country)
Nobility of Georgia (country)
20th-century poets from Georgia (country)
Male poets from Georgia (country)
19th-century male writers
20th-century male writers
20th-century dramatists and playwrights from Georgia (country)
19th-century dramatists and playwrights from Georgia (country)
Transcaucasian Teachers Seminary alumni